"Walk My Way" is a song by American pop singer Brynn Cartelli. It is Cartelli's coronation single following her victory on the fourteenth season of the singing competition The Voice. It was written by Julia Michaels, Justin Tranter, and Nicolas Monson, and produced by Jesse Shatkin.

Music video
The music video for the single was released on November 20, 2018.

Live performances
Cartelli performed the song during the 92nd Annual Macy's Thanksgiving Day Parade on November 22, 2018. Kelly Clarkson claimed on her Instagram that the vocals were live rather than lip synced.

Charts

References

2018 singles
2018 songs
Pop ballads
Republic Records singles
Songs written by Julia Michaels
Songs written by Justin Tranter
Songs written by Nick Monson
Song recordings produced by Jesse Shatkin